Bartleby.com is an electronic text archive, headquartered in Los Angeles (USA) and named for Herman Melville's story "Bartleby, the Scrivener". It was initiated with the name "Project Bartleby" in January 1993 as a collection of classic literature as part of the website of Columbia University. In February 1994, they published the first classic book in HTML code format, Walt Whitman's Leaves of Grass. It is now a commercial website operated by Barnes & Noble, though its repository of texts can still be accessed. The repository has four main categories: reference, verse, fiction, and nonfiction.

History
Barnes & Noble Education (BNED) is an independent, public company that began trading using the New York Stock Exchange on August 3, 2015. In 2016 it acquired Student Brands, an education technology company which was then operating Bartleby.com as a digital study website. In 2017, BNED announced the start of an on-line commercial study aid system, named "bartleby", as part of the Company’s reporting segment Digital Student Solutions (DSS). Due to the site’s ability to gain user acquisition by SEO, Bartleby.com was chosen to serve as the basis of a new set of products and services emphasizing improving student success and outcomes.

Student cheating

Bartleby's system Learn provides a question-and-answer service similar to that of Chegg. Students have been using this to "contract cheat". Some universities therefore explicitly forbid students from using Bartleby's Q&A service for contract cheating.

References

External links 
 
 Site index

Commercial digital libraries
Digital humanities projects
American digital libraries